M'mah Soumah (born 10 May 1985 in Conakry) is a Guinean judoka who competed in the women's half-lightweight category. She picked up a bronze medal in the 52-kg division at the 2004 African Judo Championships in Tunis, Tunisia, and represented her nation Guinea at the 2004 Summer Olympics.

Soumah qualified as a lone female athlete and judoka for the Guinean squad in the women's half-lightweight class (52 kg) at the 2004 Summer Olympics in Athens, by granting a tripartite invitation from the International Judo Federation. She lost her opening match to Portugal's Telma Monteiro, who scored an ippon victory and quickly subdued her on the tatami with a seoi nage (shoulder throw) at eighteen seconds.

References

External links

1985 births
Living people
Guinean female judoka
Olympic judoka of Guinea
Judoka at the 2004 Summer Olympics
Sportspeople from Conakry